Edney is a surname. Notable people with the surname include:

 Beatie Edney (born 1962), British actress
 Dennis Edney, Canadian defense attorney
 June Edney (born 1956), British cricketer
 Leon A. Edney (born 1935), American admiral
 Samuel Edney (born 1984), Canadian luger
 Sarah Edney (born 1993), Canadian ice hockey player
 Spike Edney (born 1951), British musician
 Tyus Edney (born 1973), American basketball player and coach

See also
Edneyville, North Carolina, named after early settlers, brothers Samuel and Asa Edney